Bayou Vista is a census-designated place (CDP) in St. Mary Parish, Louisiana, United States. The population was 4,652 at the 2010 census. It is part of the Morgan City Micropolitan Statistical Area.

Geography
Bayou Vista is located at  (29.690521, -91.269048).

Demographics

2020 census

As of the 2020 United States census, there were 4,213 people, 1,859 households, and 1,030 families residing in the CDP.

2000 census
As of the census of 2000, there were 4,351 people, 1,606 households, and 1,178 families residing in the CDP. The racial makeup of the CDP was 91.89% White, 3.63% African American, 1.03% Native American, 0.25% Asian, 0.05% Pacific Islander, 1.36% from other races, and 1.79% from two or more races. Hispanic or Latino of any race were 2.55% of the population.

There were 1,606 households, out of which 38.9% had children under the age of 18 living with them, 57.2% were married couples living together, 10.3% had a female householder with no husband present, and 26.6% were non-families. 22.0% of all households were made up of individuals, and 6.5% had someone living alone who was 65 years of age or older. The average household size was 2.70 and the average family size was 3.17.

In the CDP, the population was spread out, with 29.5% under the age of 18, 9.1% from 18 to 24, 31.7% from 25 to 44, 20.3% from 45 to 64, and 9.4% who were 65 years of age or older. The median age was 33 years. For every 100 females, there were 98.9 males. For every 100 females age 18 and over, there were 97.1 males.

The median income for a household in the CDP was $30,234, and the median income for a family was $34,526. Males had a median income of $32,066 versus $21,645 for females. The per capita income for the CDP was $14,516. About 15.1% of families and 18.4% of the population were below the poverty line, including 17.7% of those under age 18 and 23.0% of those age 65 or over.

References

Census-designated places in Louisiana
Census-designated places in St. Mary Parish, Louisiana